American War may refer to:

American War (novel) a 2017 novel by Omar El Akkad
Vietnam War, known in Vietnam as the American War (1955–1975)

See also
List of conflicts in the United States
List of wars involving the United States
American Civil War (1861–1865)
American Revolutionary War or American War of Independence (1775–1783)
War in Afghanistan (2001–2021)
War of 1812 (1812–1815)